Domagoj Kosić (born 11 November 1975) is a retired Croatian football midfielder.

References

1975 births
Living people
Footballers from Zagreb
Association football defenders
Croatian footballers
NK Pazinka players
GNK Dinamo Zagreb players
NK Hrvatski Dragovoljac players
NK Inter Zaprešić players
Maccabi Tel Aviv F.C. players
HNK Šibenik players
NK Zagreb players
NK Slaven Belupo players
AZAL PFK players
Croatian Football League players
Israeli Premier League players
Azerbaijan Premier League players
Croatian expatriate footballers
Expatriate footballers in Israel
Croatian expatriate sportspeople in Israel
Expatriate footballers in Azerbaijan
Croatian expatriate sportspeople in Azerbaijan